Hjalmar Hjorth Boyesen (23 September 1848 – 4 October 1895) was a Norwegian-American author and college professor. He is best remembered for his novel Gunnar: A Tale of Norse Life, which is generally considered to have been the first novel by a Norwegian immigrant in America.

Biography
He was born at the Norwegian naval base Fredriksvern, near the village of Stavern in Vestfold County, Norway. Boyesen grew up in Fredriksvern, then in Kongsberg, and, from 1854, at Systrand in Sogn. From 1860, he went to Drammen Latin School, and, after his final exams, he took another exam at the university in 1868. Boyesen was well-schooled in both German and Scandinavian literature, graduating from the University of Leipzig and the University of Oslo.

Career
Boyesen migrated to the United States during 1869 and initially became assistant editor of Fremad, a Norwegian language weekly published in Chicago.  The multi-lingual Boyesen subsequently taught Greek and Latin classes at Urbana University. Boyesen was a professor of North European Languages at Cornell University from 1874 to 1880. Boyesen became a professor of Germanic languages at Columbia University in 1881. His scholarly works included Goethe and Schiller,  Essays on German Literature, A Commentary on the Works of Henrik Ibsen and Essays on Scandinavian Literature.

Through his public lectures, Boyesen won a reputation as an excellent lecturer. He was a prolific writer, and, over 20 years, he published 25 books including novels, short stories, poems, and literary criticism. He also published short stories, essays, and book reviews in periodicals. Boyesen is more commonly known for his works of popular fiction. His most successful books have remained those based upon Norwegian culture and habits. He wrote many books of fiction for adults and children and some poetry. .

Selected bibliography
Gunnar: A Tale of Norse Life (1874)
A Norseman's Pilgrimage (1875)
Falconberg (1879)
Goethe and Schiller (1879)
Ilka on the Hill Top (1881)
A Daughter of the Philistines (1883)
Alpine Roses (1884) (play)
A Daring Fiction (1884)
Mikkel (1884)
Vagabond Tales (1889)
Against Heavy Old (1890)
The Mammon of Unrighteousness (1891)
Idyls of Norway and Other Poems (1892)
Boyhood in Norway: stories of boy-life in the Land of the Midnight Sun (1892)
Essays on German Literature (1892)
The Social Strugglers (1893)
A Commentary on the Works of Henrik Ibsen (1894)
Against heavy odds: a tale of Norse heroism, and a fearless trio (1894)
Norse Tales (1894)
Essays on Scandinavian Literature (1895)

References

Further reading
 Glasrud, Clarence A. (1963). Hjalmar Hjorth Boyesen  (Northfield: Norwegian-American Historical Association)
 Fredrickson, Robert S. (1980). Hjalmar Hjorth Boyesen  (Boston: Twayne Publishers)
  Seyersted, Per (1984). From Norwegian Romantic to American Realist: Studies in Life and Writings of Hjalmar Hjorth Boyesen  (Oslo: Solum: Publications of the American Institute, University of Oslo)
 Eckstein, Neil Truman (1990). Marginal Man As Novelist: The Norwegian-American Writers H.H Boyesen and O.E. Rolvaag  (Taylor & Francis)

External links

“NAHA. Promise of America – Hjalmar Hjorth Boyesen”
 
 
 

1848 births
1895 deaths
Leipzig University alumni
University of Oslo alumni
Cornell University faculty
Columbia University faculty
19th-century American novelists
People from Larvik
Norwegian emigrants to the United States
American male novelists
19th-century American male writers
Novelists from New York (state)